Kostakan is a north-south trending chain of cinder cones located in the southern part of the Kamchatka Peninsula, Russia.

Geology 

Volcanism of the Kostakan cones belongs to a pattern of basaltic volcanism that is recognized to the west of Kamchatka's Eastern Volcanic Zone (GVP).

The Kostakan cones are found south of Bakening volcano, from Kostakan Lake southward in a north-south lineament (GVP). They are associated with lava flows and maars. (Ponomareva et al. 2007).

Activity commenced in the Pleistocene and continued on into the Holocene, with the latest eruption occurring perhaps 1350 at Glavny cone. Other eruptions occurred 1200, 1000, 800, 6550 BP and 8050 BP, with varying uncertainties (GVP).

Their composition ranges from basalt to basaltic andesite, with medium contents of potassium (Ponomareva et al. 2007).

See also
 List of volcanoes in Russia

References 
 
 
 

Volcanoes of the Kamchatka Peninsula
Cinder cones
Mountains of the Kamchatka Peninsula
Holocene volcanoes
Holocene Asia